Kyosuke Oyama (小山 恭輔, Oyama Kyosuke, born 26 December 1987) is a Paralympic swimmer from Japan competing mainly in category S6 events.

Oyama grew up in Higashikurume in the western part of the Tokyo metropolits. As a junior high school student, he was paralyzed in half of his body.

He competed in the 50m, 100m and 400m freestyle at the 2008 Summer Paralympics but it was in the 50m butterfly that he won his only medal, a silver behind Xu Qing of China who broke the world record in winning the race.

References

External links 
 
 Kyosuke Oyama - Montreal 2013 IPC Swimming World Championships at the International Paralympic Committee

1987 births
Living people
Japanese male butterfly swimmers
Japanese male freestyle swimmers
Paralympic swimmers of Japan
Paralympic silver medalists for Japan
Paralympic bronze medalists for Japan
Swimmers at the 2008 Summer Paralympics
Swimmers at the 2012 Summer Paralympics
Medalists at the 2008 Summer Paralympics
Medalists at the 2012 Summer Paralympics
S6-classified Paralympic swimmers
Medalists at the World Para Swimming Championships
Paralympic medalists in swimming
20th-century Japanese people
21st-century Japanese people